Josep Prades i Gallent (1689–1757; born and died in Villahermosa del Río, Castelló) was a Spanish organist and composer at Valencia Cathedral during the Baroque period.

Life
By 1700 Prades was singing in the choir of Valencia Cathedral, where he probably learned from Joan Baptista Cabanilles. In 1712 he was appointed organist and chapel master in the church of Algemesi, and in 1717 he was appointed to the same duties  in the church of Santa Maria in Castelló de la Plana. Finally, in 1728, he was appointed chapel master in Valencia Cathedral, where he strengthened the musical chapel by contracting new musicians and increasing the importance of the instrumental parts. After twenty nine years of dedicated labour he asked to be allowed to retire for reasons of health, and died, probably from an attack of apoplexy, in his native village, Vilafermosa (Villahermosa).

Works

Religious vocal music in Latin
 11 Mass
 24 Motets
 56 Psalms
 1 Lamentation
 9 Songs
 4 Antiphon
 2 Versos
 3 Passions

Religious vocal music in Castilian
 95 Villancico to Nacimiento 95 Villancico to Corpus Christi 82 Villancico to Virgin Mary
 22 Villancico to Saints
 5 Villancico to nunks
 4 cantates
 Other minor works

Recordings
 Criaturas de Dios. Espais de Llum Musical, 1 CD. (2008).
 El Gran Padre de Familias. Espais de Llum Musical, 1 CD. (2008).
 Galán Embozado. Espais de Llum Musical, 1 CD. (2008).

References
 P. Capdepón, J.M. García Laborda, T. Schmitt, R.M. Pérez Laguna. El compositor castellonense José Pradas (1689–1757) y la música de su época''. Fundación Dávalos-Fletcher. Castelló de la Plana, 2001. 

Spanish Baroque composers
Baroque musicians
1689 births
1757 deaths
Spanish classical organists
Male classical organists
Cathedral organists
Composers for pipe organ
People from the Province of Castellón
Spanish male classical composers
18th-century keyboardists
18th-century classical composers
18th-century male musicians